is a Japanese film director and animator. He was nominated for an Academy Award in the category Best Animated Feature Film at the 91st Academy Awards for his eighth film Mirai.

Life and career

Early life and initial work at Toei Animation 
Hosoda was born in Kamiichi, Nakaniikawa District, Toyama, Japan. His father worked as a railway engineer, and his mother was a tailor. Hosoda initially felt inspired to take up animation as a career after seeing The Castle of Cagliostro, the first film directed by Hayao Miyazaki of Studio Ghibli fame. He majored in oil painting at the Kanazawa College of Art in Ishikawa Prefecture.

After graduation, Hosoda was able to land an animation job at Toei Animation, after submitting a short film that he had animated in his spare time. He initially applied at Studio Ghibli; though he did not get the job, he received a rejection letter of praise from Hayao Miyazaki himself.

During his time at Toei, Hosoda worked his way up, garnering public attention in the early 2000s with the first two films in the Digimon Adventure series. Shortly after the release of Our War Game!, Hosoda attracted the eye of Ghibli head producer Toshio Suzuki.

Studio Ghibli 
Studio Ghibli announced that Hosoda was to direct the film Howl's Moving Castle in September 2001. This was scheduled for a summer 2003 release. However, production on the film became strained due to creative differences. According to Hosoda, he "was told to make [the movie] similar to how Miyazaki would have made it, but [he] wanted to make [his] own film the way [he] wanted to make it". In the end, Hosoda left in the summer of 2002 during the early production stages, after failing to come up with a concept acceptable to Studio Ghibli bosses.

Return to Toei, and departure to Madhouse 
Proceeding his departure from Ghibli, Hosoda returned to Toei and worked on a few animations in collaboration with artist Takashi Murakami, such as the commercial Superflat Monogram for Louis Vuitton and directed a One Piece feature film, One Piece: Baron Omatsuri and the Secret Island.

In 2004, Mamoru Hosada met Yuichiro Saito, with whom he worked together in the opening of Shinichiro Watanabe’s Samurai Champloo (2004). That experience would lead to future collaborations between them.

During this time, he directed an episode of Ojamajo Doremi, which was inspired by his turbulent time at Ghibli. This episode led to him being hired at the animation studio Madhouse, which he worked at from 2005 to 2011.

At Madhouse, Hosoda earned critical acclaim with his directing efforts, including 2006's The Girl Who Leapt Through Time (which won Japan Academy Prize for Animation of the Year in 2007) and 2009's Summer Wars (which won the same award in 2010).

Studio Chizu 
Hosoda left Madhouse in 2011 to establish his own animation studio, Studio Chizu, with Yuichiro Saito who produced The Girl Who Leapt Through Time and Summer Wars. As of November 2021, Studio Chizu has released four films directed by Hosoda: 2012's Wolf Children, 2015's The Boy and the Beast, 2018's Mirai and 2021's Belle. Mirai was nominated for Best Animated Feature for the 2019 Oscars.

Filmography

Film

Television
 Digimon Adventure (episode 21, 1999)
 Ojamajo Doremi Dokkān (episode 40, 49)
 One Piece (episode 199)
 Ashita no Nadja (opening, ending, episodes 5, 12, 26)
 Samurai Champloo (opening under the pseudonym Katsuyo Hashimoto)

As key animator
 Ashita no Nadja (episode 26)
 Crying Freeman
 Dragon Ball: The Path to Power
 Dragon Ball Z (episode 173)
 Dragon Ball Z: Broly – The Legendary Super Saiyan
 Dragon Ball Z: Broly – Second Coming
 Galaxy Express 999 ~Eternal Fantasy~
 GeGeGe no Kitarō (1996 series, Episode 94, 105, 113)
GeGeGe no Kitarō: Dai-Kaijū (Japanese, 1996 film)
 Slam Dunk (episodes 29, 70)
 Sailor Moon Sailor Stars (episode 7)
 Sailor Moon Super S: The Movie
 Yu Yu Hakusho The Movie: Poltergeist Report

References

External links

1967 births
Anime directors
Fantasy film directors
Japanese film directors
Living people
People from Toyama Prefecture
Science fiction film directors